Noon (Arabic: نون) is an e-commerce platform in the Arab world. The company was launched in 2016.

History 
The company was founded in 2016 by PIF and Mohamed Alabbar, with a value of $1 billion. Alabbar stated at a press conference that Noon is 50 percent owned by the PIF, while the remaining 50 percent is owned by him and private investors in the region. Noon's operations span Saudi Arabia, Egypt and the United Arab Emirates.

In August 2022, Noon has acquired fashion and accessories specialist Namshi from Emaar Properties.

See also

 Souq
 Jumia

References

External links 
 
 
 

Internet properties established in 2016
Retail companies established in 2016
Companies based in Riyadh